Deepak Vasant Kalal (Born February 18, 1972) is an Indian actor and travel vlogger from Pune, Maharashtra. In 2017 his video Modiji me aapko pappi dunga went viral. He became an internet sensation in 2018 after Bollywood actress Rakhi Sawant announced she was marrying him. Deepak Kalal is popular on the internet for his cross gender comedy videos.

Early life 
Deepak Kalal was born in Pune, Maharashtra. After completing his schooling, he worked as a receptionist at a hotel in Pune. He also did a short management course at Bandra College. His parents live in Los Angeles.

Career
Kalal started as a travelling vlogger and started making videos in 2017, mostly on Kashmir. He went viral on the internet after CarryMinati made a roast video of his videos. In 2018, he became an internet sensation after Bollywood celebrity Rakhi Sawant announced her marriage to him, which was later exposed as a spoof wedding. Kalal appeared in India's Got Talent (season 8).

Discography
Kalal has been featured in various popular songs and albums.

Controversies
Kalal's fans believed him as he came out to be "transgender", due to posting such video wearing bra. In 2017, Kalal's video Modiji me aapko pappi dunga went viral. He was accused of disloyalty to India. In 2019, Kalal was beaten by a man on 15 January in Gurugram and told to stop making videos. The incident was livestreamed on YouTube. Two days later, Kalal was beaten at Delhi Metro. He was also fought by "Thara Bhai Joginder" who makes similar sort of videos on YouTube and frequently trolled by Kalal on Instagram live video calls.

References

Indian YouTubers
Travelers
1972 births
Living people
Comedy YouTubers